You'll Get Over It is a gay-themed coming of age film released in 2002. The literal translation of the French title is Because of a Boy.

Plot 
Vincent (Baumgartner) is a shy boy who is on the swim team and is also a good student with his girlfriend Noémie (Maraval) and a best friend, Stéphane (Comar), life in school can't be better for him. But then, he suddenly starts to have encounters with the new boy, Bejamin (Elkaïm). They have a private meeting and then some boys write on a wall "Molina is a fag". Vincent starts getting bullied at high school, changing his life and his relationships with family and friends in ways he will have to accept.

Cast 

 Julien Baumgartner as Vincent Molina
 Julia Maraval as Noémie
 Jérémie Elkaïm as Benjamin
 François Comar as Stéphane
 Patrick Bonnel as Bernard, the Father
 Christiane Millet as Sylvie
 Antoine Michel as Régis, the Brother
 Nils Ohlund as Bruno
 Bernard Blancan as Swimming Coach
 Eric Bonicatto as French Professor

External links 
 

2002 films
2000s French-language films
French LGBT-related films
2002 romantic drama films
Gay-related films
2002 LGBT-related films
2000s French films